The 1991 Adamawa State gubernatorial election occurred on December 14, 1991. NRC candidate Abubakar Saleh Michika won the election.

Conduct
An open ballot method was used to conduct the governor's race. On October 19, 1991, the two parties held primaries to choose their standard bearers.

The election occurred on December 14, 1991. NRC candidate Abubakar Saleh Michika won the election.

References 

Gubernatorial election 1991
Adamawa State gubernatorial
Adamawa State gubernatorial election